The Komering River is a river in South Sumatra, Indonesia.
It is a tributary of the Musi River.

Geography
The river flows in the southern area of Sumatra with predominantly tropical rainforest climate (designated as Af in the Köppen–Geiger climate classification). The annual average temperature in the area is 24 °C. The warmest month is October, when the average temperature is around 26 °C, and the coldest is January, at 22 °C. The average annual rainfall is 2902 mm. The wettest month is November, with an average of 435 mm rainfall, and the driest is August, with 83 mm rainfall.

See also
List of rivers of Indonesia
List of rivers of Sumatra

References

Rivers of South Sumatra
Rivers of Indonesia